Carved in Stone is the second solo album by Mötley Crüe frontman Vince Neil. It was released in 1995 on Warner Bros. Records. It is his final release on the label.

Background
Produced by the Dust Brothers, the album welded rock and hip-hop. "That was before Kid Rock…" Neil observed in 2000, "so no-one was really ready for it then, . If it came out today it'd probably sell fifty million copies."

The album was put on hold while Neil was dealing with his daughter Skylar, who was suffering from nephroblastoma. Neil included a song on the album in honor of Skylar called "Skylar's Song". Skylar died from her illness on August 15, 1995, a month before the album was released. Following its release and a tour, Vince returned to Mötley Crüe in January 1997. This is his only album to feature bassist Robbie Crane and last for drummer Vikki Fox. Guitarist Brent Woods also plays on the record. He previously jammed with Wildside and was later a touring guitarist for Warrant.

The album charted at #139 on the Billboard 200. "Skylar's Song" was released as a single and featured a music video and "The Crawl" was released as a promo single.

Track listing
 "Breakin' in the Gun" (Frederickson, Fredricksen, Neil) – 3:52
 "The Crawl" (Crane, Foxx, Frederickson, Neil) – 4:17
 "One Way" (Frederickson, Fredricksen, Neil) – 3:51
 "Black Promises" (Crane, Foxx, Frederickson, Neil) – 4:52
 "Skylar's Song" (Crane, Neil, Woods) – 4:58
 "Make U Feel" (Frederickson, Fredricksen, Neil) – 4:01
 "Writing on the Wall" (Crane, Foxx, Frederickson, Neil) – 4:50
 "Find a Dream" (Crane, Foxx, Frederickson, Neil) – 4:54
 "One Less Mouth to Feed" (Frederickson, Fredricksen, Neil) – 3:36
 "The Rift" (Christiansen, Frederickson, Neil) – 3:57
Japanese bonus tracks
 "Lust for Life" (Iggy Pop cover)
 "25 or 6 to 4" (Chicago cover)

Personnel
Vince Neil – lead vocals, bass on "Lust For Life"
Brent Woods – guitar
Robbie Crane – bass (on all tracks except "Lust For Life")
Vikki Foxx – drums

Charts

References

Vince Neil albums
1995 albums